Helcystogramma brevinodium is a moth in the family Gelechiidae. It was described by Hou-Hun Li and Hui Zhen in 2011. It is found in the Chinese provinces of Hebei and Tianjin.

The wingspan is about 15 mm. The forewings are ochreous brown, mottled with brown scales distally and with a brown spot near the end of the cell. The hindwings are grey.

References

Moths described in 2011
brevinodium
Moths of Asia